Onno is a Dutch and East Frisian masculine given name of unclear origin. People with the name include:

Onno Behrends (1862–1920), East Frisian tea manufacturer 
Onno Boelee (1945–2003), Dutch-born New Zealand professional wrestler, actor, and stuntman 
Onno J. Boxma (born 1952), Dutch mathematician
 (born ca. 1943), Dutch ambassador
 (1713–1779), Dutch politician, playwright and poet
Onno Hoes (born 1961), Dutch VVD politician
Onno Jacobs (born 1964), Dutch businessman
Onno Klopp (1822–1903), German historian
 (1960–2008), Dutch actor
Onno Oncken (born 1955), German geologist and recipient of the 1998 Leibniz Prize 
Onno Ruding (born 1939), Dutch banker, executive director of the IMF and Minister of Finance
Onno van de Stolpe (born 1959), Dutch businessman
Onno Tunç (1948–1996), Armenian-Turkish musician born Ohannes Tunçboyacıyan

See also
Dinitrogen dioxide(ONNO)

Dutch masculine given names